Pondosa is an unincorporated community and ghost town in Union County, Oregon, United States.

The town came into being in 1927, when the four Stoddard brothers of La Grande bought land in the area.  They moved the sawmill operations of the Grande Ronde Lumber Company in nearby Perry to the site.  The town was named after the Ponderosa Pines that dotted the area.  A post office was established in 1927.  In 1931, Truman Collins of The Collins Companies of Portland bought the mill.  The mill was sold again in 1956, this time to Boise Cascade, which made plans to shut down the mill.  This caused the decline of the town, which had over 500 inhabitants at the time.  The post office was discontinued following a severe fire that damaged the majority of the town on June 20, 1959.

References

External links
Pictorial History of Pondosa from Union County, Oregon Genealogy and History

Company towns in Oregon
Ghost towns in Oregon
Unincorporated communities in Union County, Oregon
1927 establishments in Oregon
Unincorporated communities in Oregon